There are many lakes in the rural municipality of Biggar No. 347, Saskatchewan. This is about Castlewood Lake, Biggar Trout Pond, Springwater Lake and Coopers Lake. 

Castlewood Lake is located about 4.4 km west of Biggar, Saskatchewan. It is accessible from highways 14 and 51. It has a beach, dam, 4 peninsulas and an island. It is about 5 km long and 50 m wide at the widest point. At the deepest point it is about 4 m deep.

The Biggar Trout Pond is located about 2 km north of Biggar. It is accessible from Highway 4. It has an aerator, a grill, a fishing bridge, covered picnic areas and an island (sometimes bigger sometimes smaller depending on water levels. Also, depending on water levels, there might be 2 islands) It is about 200 m wide and 200 m long. It is about 1.5 m deep. It is stocked with Trout by local volunteers.

Coopers Lake is located about 4.5 km west of Biggar; right beside Castlewood Lake. It is accessible from highway 14. It is about 200 m long by 50 m wide and 4 m deep.

Springwater Lake is located about 20 km away from Biggar, Saskatchewan. It is accessible from different gravel roads; as well as HWY. 51. It is 20 km long and 500 m wide. It is about 4 m deep (gradually dropping to 2 m; then dropping off to 4 m.)

History

Castlewood Lake 

Castlewood Lake started out as a small pond used by the natives to keep fish in; in the early 1800s. Then after a few decades, the natives moved out. Over time rain turned the pond into a lake as it is now.

Coopers Lake 

Coopers Lake started out as a cow pond in the 1930s. After a while, rain and snowmelt made it deeper. Today, people have planted trees around it and it is the lake as it is now.

Biggar Trout Pond 

Biggar Trout Pond started out as farmland in the 1960s. Later, the land was bought for a 9-hole golf course. Having some land left, and already having a slough there, the town dug a 5-foot deep 200×200 m hole in the ground and filled it with water. Now it has an island and a fishing bridge.

Wildlife 

Castlewood Lake is home to many types of animals such as gulls, salamanders, muskrats, rats, mice, frogs, coyotes, ducks, geese, rabbits, mosquitoes, beetles, snails, deer and other types of birds and insects. The other two lakes have similar wildlife. Castlewood Lake also has small cacti, bushes (e.g.choke cherries, 'silverwood' bushes), and wheat (from a nearby farm).

Fishing 

The Biggar Trout Pond has trout in the spring and summer. Castlewood Lake and Coopers Lake do not have fish.

See also 
 Biggar
 List of lakes of Saskatchewan
 Rural Municipality of Biggar No. 347

References 

 Birds of the Rosetown-Biggar district – Robert D. Wapple and Wayne E. Renaud – 2010 PP.7–9
Duncan Rand – 2010 – A Day in the Life of a Town Pg. 49 (Trout Pond)-pg. 173-(Cooper's Lake)
Birds of the Rosetown-Biggar District, Saskatchewan – Wayne E. Renaud and Don H. Renaud – 1975 PP.10, 11
http://www.chinci.com/travel/pax/q/5918180/Castlewood+Lake/CA/Canada/0/#
http://www.geodata.us/canada_names_maps/maps.php?featureid=HACFC&f=242

Lakes of Saskatchewan
Biggar No. 347, Saskatchewan
Biggar
Biggar, Saskatchewan
Lakes, Biggar